Benjamin Barker may refer to:

 Benjamin Barker (painter) (1776–1838), English landscape painter
 Benjamin Fordyce Barker (1818–1891), American obstetrician
 Ben Barker (racing driver) (born 1991), British racing driver
 Ben Barker (speedway rider) (born 1988), British speedway rider
 Sweeney Todd, original name Benjamin Barker, fictional character

See also